Doruhan may refer to:
 Doruhan-e Neqareh Khaneh